The Romantic hero is a literary archetype referring to a character that rejects established norms and conventions, has been rejected by society, and has themselves at the center of their own existence. The Romantic hero is often the protagonist in a literary work, and the primary focus is on the character's thoughts rather than their actions.

Characteristics
Literary critic Northrop Frye noted that the Romantic hero is often "placed outside the structure of civilization and therefore represents the force of physical nature, amoral or ruthless, yet with a sense of power, and often leadership, that society has impoverished itself by rejecting". Other characteristics of the Romantic hero include introspection, the triumph of the individual over the "restraints of theological and social conventions", wanderlust, melancholy, misanthropy, alienation, and isolation. However, another common trait of the Romantic hero is regret for their actions, and self-criticism, often leading to philanthropy, which stops the character from ending romantically.

Usually estranged from his more grounded, realist biological family and leading a rural, solitary life, the Romantic hero may nevertheless have a long-suffering love interest, him or herself victimised by the hero's rebellious tendencies, with their fates intertwined for decades, sometimes from their youths to their deaths. (See Tatyana Larina, Elizabeth Bennet, Eugenie Grandet, et al.)

History
The Romantic hero first began appearing in literature during the Romantic period, in works by such authors as Byron, Keats, Goethe, and Pushkin, and is seen in part as a response to the French Revolution. As Napoleon, the "living model of a hero", became a disappointment to many, the typical notion of the hero as upholding social order began to be challenged.

Examples
Classic literary examples of the Romantic hero include:
Alexander Romance account of the life and exploits of Alexander the Great
Captain Ahab from Herman Melville's novel, Moby-Dick
The titular character in Samuel Taylor Coleridge's poem, The Rime of the Ancient Mariner
Andrei Bolkonsky in Leo Tolstoy's novel, War and Peace
Ponyboy Curtis in S.E. Hinton's novel, The Outsiders
Edmond Dantès in Alexandre Dumas (père)'s adventure novel, The Count of Monte Cristo
 Mr. Darcy in Jane Austen's novel, Pride and Prejudice
Victor Frankenstein in Mary Shelley's novel, Frankenstein
The titular characters in Lord Byron's narrative poems Don Juan and Childe Harold's Pilgrimage
Gwynplaine in Victor Hugo's novel, The Man Who Laughs
"Hawkeye" (Natty Bumppo) in James Fenimore Cooper's Leatherstocking Tales pentalogy of historical novels
 Philip Marlowe in Raymond Chandler's seven novels about the Los Angeles detective
The titular character in Pushkin's novel in verse, Eugene Onegin
Hester Prynne in Nathaniel Hawthorne's novel, The Scarlet Letter
The titular character in François-René Chateaubriand's novella, René
Werther in Goethe's epistolary, loosely autobiographical novel, The Sorrows of Young Werther
Faust in Goethe's Faust
Sir Guy Morville in Charlotte Mary Yonge’s The Heir of Redclyffe (1853)

See also
Anti-hero
 Byronic hero
 List of fictional anti-heroes
 Romanticism 
 Tragic flaw
Epic hero

References

Literary archetypes
Heroes
Hero